Abu Suraiya Saburah ibn Ma'bad ibn 'Ausaja al-Juhani, or Sabrah ibn Ma'bad al-Juhani (Arabic: سبرة بن معبد) was one of the companions of Muhammad. Other transliterations of his name include Abu Rabi' al-Madani and Sabura al-Juhanni.

Biography

Family
He was from the Juhinah tribe located around the city of Medina, Saudi Arabia. The Juhainah tribe still inhabits the area around the city of Medina today. He had a son named Rabi ibn Sabra.

Life
He lived in Medina, participated in the Battle of the Trench, and died during the rule of Muawiya I.

Narrations
He is the source for the hadith of Sabra reporting on the prohibition of Mut'ah.

References

Sahabah hadith narrators
7th-century deaths
Year of birth unknown